The Master Chandgi Ram Sports Stadium, Saifai is an national-level sports complex having a hockey pitch, multipurpose hall (badminton & wrestling facilities), a swimming pool and Sports Authority of India (SAI) Training Centre in Saifai, Etawah District of Uttar Pradesh. It is named after  Haryanvi wrestler Chandgi Ram.

Sports Facilities

Astroturf Hockey field
The stadium has facilities like a 20,000-capacity Astroturf hockey field with synthetic running track, base & synthetic surface. It witnesses 5th Senior National Hockey Championship 2015(Women).

Swimming Pool
It is a swimming pool which fulfills international standards of swimming.

Multipurpose Hall 
This sports complex had a multipurpose hall too. It is used for badminton and wrestling practice.

Sports Authority of India (SAI) Training Centre

Master Chandgi Ram Sports Stadium also has a sports training centre of Sports Authority of India in its campus. It offers residential training in Athletics, Field hockey, Handball and Wrestling and non-residential training in Shooting.

Notable athletes
Stadium is used by Sports Authority of India, Major Dhyan Chand Sports College, Saifai (Hockey and Swimming only) and Saifai Sports Hostel of Uttar Pradesh Government. Some  notable athletes who used to practice here are-
 Gopi Sonkar, India men's national field hockey team (Saifai Sports Hostel)

Sports College

Saifai village has a residential sports college, established in 2014. It offers teaching from 6th to 12th standardand by the curriculum of Board of High School and Intermediate Education, Uttar Pradesh (U.P. Board) and sports training in cricket, football, hockey, wrestling, athletics, badminton, swimming and kabaddi. Although it has owne campus and facilities but students of sports college use hockey, wrestling, badminton and swimming facilities of the stadium too.

See also
 International Cricket Stadium, Saifai
 Amitabh Bachchan Sports Complex

References

Field hockey in Uttar Pradesh
Sports venues in Uttar Pradesh
Saifai
Buildings and structures in Etawah district
Sport in Saifai
Year of establishment missing